Thomas Wayne Curtis (born April 20, 1991) is an American actor. Curtis has starred in the 2000 movie The Cactus Kid, and appeared in Sweet Home Alabama, Red Dragon, The Chumscrubber and Hansel & Gretel. He also starred alongside Academy Award winning actress Charlize Theron in the critically acclaimed film North Country in 2005. His latest acting role is as "Tom Olsen" in the TV series While the Children Sleep.

Filmography

Feature films

Television

References

External links

1991 births
American male child actors
American male film actors
Place of birth missing (living people)
American male television actors
Living people